Bəhliyan (also, Bakhliin and Bakhliyan) is a village in the Ismailli Rayon of Azerbaijan.  The village forms part of the municipality of Şəbiyan.

Notes

References 

Populated places in Ismayilli District